Nitrate reductase (quinone) (nitrate reductase A, nitrate reductase Z, quinol/nitrate oxidoreductase, quinol-nitrate oxidoreductase, quinol:nitrate oxidoreductase, NarA, NarZ, NarGHI) is an enzyme with systematic name nitrite:quinone oxidoreductase. This enzyme catalyses the following chemical reaction

 nitrate + a quinol  nitrite + a quinone + H2O

This is a membrane-bound enzyme which supports [anaerobic respiration] on nitrate.

References

External links 
 

EC 1.7.5